Robert William Likins (May 12, 1921 – November 21, 1962) was an American javelin thrower who competed in the 1948 Summer Olympics.

References

1921 births
1962 deaths
American male javelin throwers
Olympic track and field athletes of the United States
Athletes (track and field) at the 1948 Summer Olympics